Ishq Mein Marjawan 2: Naya Safar is an Indian romantic-thriller web series that premiered on Voot Select on 15 March 2021. Produced by Yash A Patnaik, it starred Helly Shah and Rrahul Sudhir. The series went off air on 5 July 2021 in India.

Cast

Main
 Helly Shah as Riddhima Vansh Raisinghania: Sara / Gayatri and Sejal's childhood friend; Kabir's ex-fiancé; Vansh's wife. (2021)
 Rrahul Sudhir as Vansh Raisinghania: Riddhima's husband; Ajay and Uma's son; Ishani and Sia's elder brother; Anupriya's step-son; Kabir's step-brother; Ragini's ex-fiancée and Ahana's fake husband. (2021)
Vishal Vashishtha as Kabir Sharma: A cunning cop; Anupriya's son; Vansh, Ishani and Siya's step-brother; Riddhima's ex-lover; Ahana's fake fiancée and Neha's colleague. (2021)
Ankit Siwach as Vyom: Madhuri's husband; Pihu's father; Sia's love interest, Vansh's childhood friend turned enemy. (2021)

Recurring
 Manasvi Vashist as Aryan Raisinghania: Rudra and Chanchal's son; Vansh, Sia and Ishani's cousin brother, and Kiara's love interest. (2021)
 Chandni Sharma as Ishani Raisinghania: Vansh's younger sister; Angre's wife (2021)
 Zayn Ibad Khan as Angre: Ishani's husband; Vansh's right-hand (2021)
 Nikita Tiwari as Sia Raisinghania: Vansh's younger sister (2021)
 Meenakshi Sethi as Indrani Raisinghania: Ajay and Rudra's mother; Vansh, Sia, Ishani, and Aryan's grandmother (2021)
 Khalida Jaan as Anupriya Raisinghania: Ajay's second wife; Kabir's biological mother; Vansh, Sia, and Ishani's step-mother (2021)
 Geetu Bawa/ Payas Pandit as Chanchal Rudra Raisinghania: Rudra's wife; Aryan's mother (2021)
 Kristina Patel as Sara/Gayatri: a contract killer; Riddhima's childhood friend (2021)
 Riya Bhattacharjee as Kiara: Aryan's love interest (2021)

Production 

In February 2021 Ishq Mein Marjawan 2 announced to move the series to Voot Select. Later it was announced that the series will stream on 15 March 2021 with its new season Ishq Mein Marjawan 2: Naya Safar. In March 2021 Ankit Siwach was introduced as Vyom, a gangster, in the parallel lead role.

The series premiered on Colors Rishtey UK on 29 March 2021. It airs from Monday to Friday 10PM.

In early April 2021, Ankit Siwach tested positive for COVID-19.

The series premiered on Voot USA on 5 April 2021. It streams Monday to Friday.

The series was temporarily shot in Goa due to the COVID-19 curfew from 14 April 2021 to 1 May 2021 in Maharashtra The curfew was extended till 15 May 2021. On 7 May 2021, the Goa government cancelled the permission for shoots due to a rise in the COVID-19 cases.

The series was shot in Siliguri after the lockdown in Goa.

The shooting of the series ended on 9 June 2021.

Reception

Ratings

In UK the viewership on week ending Sunday 4 April 2021 was 13,400 K viewers, making it the 3rd most-watched serial on Colors Rishtey UK. The Ratings then dropped but it still was the 2nd most watched on Colors Rishtey UK gathering 11,800 K viewers on week ending 16 May 2021. The Viewership increased on week ending Sunday 13 June 2021 with 16,700 K viewers, making it the most watched serial on Colors Rishtey UK.

Episode list

References

External links 

 
 Ishq Mein Marjawan 2: Naya Safar on Voot

Hindi-language television shows
2021 Indian television series debuts